Mid-West Family Broadcasting is an independently owned broadcasting company based in Madison, Wisconsin. The company owns and manages radio stations in Madison, Wisconsin, Eau Claire, Wisconsin, La Crosse, Wisconsin, Benton Harbor/St. Joseph, Michigan, South Bend/Elkhart, Indiana, Springfield, Illinois, Springfield, Missouri, and Rockford, Illinois. In 2013 Mid-West Family purchased the Maverick stations in Rockford, Illinois and Eau Claire, Wisconsin. This added 11 stations starting May 1, 2013 with an LMA.

On November 2, 2015, Gray Television agreed to sell the WSBT radio group to Mid-West Family when the deal to acquire the television and radio assets of Schurz Communications closes. This will add four stations in the Michiana area to Mid-West's lineup.

Owned & operated stations
DeKalb, Illinois
WDKB - 94.9 FM - Hot Adult Contemporary

Eau Claire, Wisconsin
WAYY - 790 AM / 105.1 FM - News/sports
WEAQ - 1150 AM / 95.9 FM - Rhythmic Top 40
WECL - 92.9 FM - Active rock
WIAL - 94.1 FM - Hot AC
WISM-FM - 98.1 FM - Classic Hits
WAXX - 104.5 FM - Country

Madison, Wisconsin
WLMV - 1480 AM / 94.5 FM - Latin pop
WHIT - 1550 AM / 97.7 FM- Classic Country
WOZN - 1670 AM / 96.7 FM - sports talk
WJQM - 93.1 FM - Rhythmic top 40
WJJO - 94.1 FM - Active rock
WMGN - 98.1 FM - Adult contemporary
WWQM-FM - 106.3 FM - Country music
WRIS-FM - 106.7 FM - Alternative rock

La Crosse, Wisconsin
WKTY - 580 AM / 96.7 FM - Sports
WIZM - 1410 AM / 92.3 FM / 106.7 FM - News/talk
WIZM-FM - 93.3 FM - Top 40/CHR
KCLH - 94.7 FM - Classic hits
WRQT - 95.7 FM - Active rock
KQYB - 98.3 FM / 103.9 FM / 107.7 FM - Country

St. Joseph/Benton Harbor/South Haven, Michigan
WQYQ - 1400 AM / 106.1 FM - Alternative Rock
WSJM-FM - 94.9 FM - News/Talk/Sports
WYTZ - 97.5 FM - Country
WCXT - 98.3 FM - Soft AC
WCSY-FM - 103.7 FM - SuperHits 
WIRX - 107.1 FM - Mainstream Rock

South Bend, Indiana/Elkhart, Indiana
WSBT - 960 AM - Sports
WNSN - 101.5 FM - Adult Contemporary
WZOC - 94.3 FM - Classic rock
WQLQ - 99.9 FM - Top 40/CHR
WQLQ-HD2 - 95.3 FM - Classic Rock
WQLQ-HD3 - 96.1 FM - Country

Springfield, Illinois
WMAY - 970 AM / 94.7 FM / 102.5 FM - Classic hits
WMAY-FM - 92.7 FM - News/talk
WQLZ - 97.7 FM - AAA
WNNS - 98.7 FM - Adult contemporary/AC

Springfield, Missouri
KOSP - 92.9 FM - Rhythmic top 40
KQRA - 102.1 FM - Modern rock
KKLH - 104.7 FM - Classic rock
KOMG - 105.1 FM - Classic country

Rockford, Illinois
WRTB - "The Bull" - 95.3 FM - Country
WGFB - 103.1 FM - Adult contemporary/AC
WXRX - 104.9 FM - Active rock
WXRX-HD2 - 100.5 - Classic hits
WNTA - 1330 AM / 97.1 FM - Sports talk

References

External links
Corporate website

Companies based in Madison, Wisconsin
Radio broadcasting companies of the United States
Privately held companies based in Wisconsin